Jakub Kaczmarek (born 27 September 1993) is a Polish professional racing cyclist, who currently rides for UCI Continental team .

Major results
2010
 1st  Road race, National Junior Road Championships
2015
 8th Overall Course de Solidarność et des Champions Olympiques
2018
 8th Overall Tour of Małopolska
 9th International Race Grand Prix Doliny Baryczy Milicz
 10th Overall Course de Solidarność et des Champions Olympiques
2019
 6th Overall Bałtyk–Karkonosze Tour
 7th Overall Course de Solidarność et des Champions Olympiques
 9th Puchar Ministra Obrony Narodowej
2020
 1st  Overall Tour of Szeklerland
1st  Mountains classification
1st Stage 2
 1st  Overall Belgrade Banjaluka
1st Stage 2
 4th Road race, National Junior Road Championships
 5th Overall Tour de Serbie
 7th Grand Prix Velo Alanya
2021
 1st  Overall Tour of Romania
 4th Overall Szlakiem Grodów Piastowskich
1st Stage 3 
 6th GP Adria Mobil
 7th International Rhodes Grand Prix
2022
 1st  Overall Belgrade Banjaluka
1st Stage 1 (TTT) & 3

References

External links
 

1993 births
Living people
Polish male cyclists
Sportspeople from Kalisz